Scouting in West Virginia has a long history, from the 1910s to the present day, serving thousands of youth in programs that suit the environment in which they live.

Early history (1909-1950)

In 1920, the Fairmont Council was founded. It closed in 1922.

In 1921, the Morgantown Council was founded. It closed in 1923.

In 1922, the Grafton Council was founded. It closed in 1923.

In 1923, the New River District Council (#615) was founded. It closed in 1923.

In 1928, the Mountaineer Area Council was founded.

In 1925, the McDowell County Council (#707) was founded. It changed its name to the Southern West Virginia Council (#707) in 1928.

In 1925, the Charleston Council (#617) was founded. It changed its name to the Charleston Area Council (#617) in 1929.

In 1926, the Logan County Council (#756) was founded. It changed its name to the Logan-Boone Area Council (#756) in 1930. It merged into the Logan-Boone-Mingo Area Council (#756) in 1935.

In 1930, the Kentucky-West Virginia Council (#626) was founded. It merged into the Logan-Boone-Mingo Area Council (#756) in 1934. It changed its name to the Cornstalk Council (#756) in 1953. It changed its name to the Chief Cornstalk Council (#756) in 1954. It merged into the Buckskin Council (#617) in 1990.

In 1929, the Charleston Area Council (#617) was founded. It changed its name to the Buckskin Council (#617) in 1949.

In 1946, the Appalachian Council (#673) was founded. It merged into the Southern West Virginia Council (#707) in 1955. It changed its name to the Appalachian Council (#707) in 1956. In 1991, the council merged into the Buckskin Council (#617).

In 1949, the Buckskin Council (#617) was founded.

In 1919, the Parkersburg Council (#618) was founded. It changed its name to the Kootaga Area Council (#618) in 1933. In 1990, it merged into the Allohak Council (#618).

In 1916, the Clarksburg Council (#616) was founded. It changed its name to the Clarksburg Area Council (#616) in 1936. It changed its name to the Central West Virginia Council (#616) in 1941. In 1990, it merged into the Allohak Council (#618).

In 1916, the Wheeling Council (#619) was founded. It changed its name to the Wheeling and Moundsville Council (#619) in 1923. It changed its name to the Wheeling Area Council (#619) in 1925. It changed its name to the Huroquois Council (#619) in 1926. It changed its name to the National Trail Council (#619) in 1966. It changed its name to the Ohio River Valley Council (#619) in 1991.

In 1919, the Huntington Council (#672) was founded. It changed its name to the Huntington Area Council (#672) in 1924. It changed its name to the Tri-State Area Council (#672) in 1935.

Recent history (1950-present)

In 1990, the Allohak Council (#618) was created from the merger of the Central West Virginia Council (#616) and the Kootaga Area Council (#618).

The Summit Bechtel Family National Scout Reserve, often shortened as Summit Bechtel Reserve (SBR) and The Summit, located in Mount Hope, West Virginia, near Beckley, is one of four facilities managed by the National Council of the Boy Scouts of America (BSA). The Summit is the home of the national Scout jamboree, The Paul R. Christen National High Adventure Base, The James C. Justice National Scout Camp, and the Thomas S. Monson Leadership Excellence Complex. The facility hosted the 2013 National Scout Jamboree.

Boy Scouts of America in West Virginia today

There are nine Boy Scouts of America local (BSA) councils in West Virginia. Most  of West Virginia lies within the BSA's Central Region,  Mineral, Hardy, Hampshire, are part of the Northeast Region.  Pendleton, Morgan, Berkeley and Jefferson counties, are part of the Southern  Region.

Allohak Council

The Allohak Council was created in 1990 but was disbanded on December 31, 2018.

It was composed of six districts and served West Virginia and Ohio.  The council headquarters was in Parkersburg, West Virginia.

History

Split of Council
Buckskin Council
Blennerhassett District - Counties of Ritchie, Wood (except Williamstown), and Belpre, Ohio became part of the newly formed Kootaga District of the Buckskin Council
Little Kanawha District - Counties of Calhoun, Jackson, Roane, and Wirt became part of the newly formed Kootaga District in the Buckskin Council

Mountaineer Council
Highland District - Counties of Barbour, Upshur, Randolph, Tucker moved into the Mountaineer Council 
Stonewall Jackson District - Counties of Doddridge, Gilmer, Harrison, and Lewis moved into the Mountaineer Council.

Simon Kenton Council
Hock Hocking District - Athens County, Ohio moved into the Simon Kenton Council

Muskingum Valley Council
Washington District - Counties of Pleasants, Washington County, Ohio (except Belpre), and Williamstown moved into the Muskingum Valley Council.

Camps

Camp Kootaga is located in Wirt County, WV. It serves as the summer camp for the Allohak Council. The camp is located on approximately 600 acres of forest land along the Hughes River. Each year 5 weeks of summer camp are conducted at Camp Kootaga. Camp Kootaga has 14 campsites.

The property known as Camp Kootaga was purchased in 1922 by Don B. Lowe under the Gim-O-Gash tribe of the Boy Scouts of America. The first long-term summer camp was held that year on the banks of the Hughes River in the Kootaga region. This camp consisted of one or two Troops from the Parkersburg area with Don B. Lowe as the Camp Director during the early years. In 1929 Col. R. L. Cole brought a Kiowa Indian named J. Dougannah to help with the camp program. He gave Indian names to the Leaders and named the Boy Scout camp "Kootaga" which means "Good Friends." Through the years, Camp Kootaga has gone through many changes, but one thing has remained constant: helping develop young men into upstanding citizens and outstanding individuals.

Camp Mahonegon, sitting of approximately 500 acres in Upshur County, is the second camp in the Allohak Council. Though no longer used as an active summer camp, Mahonegon has remained an active part of the council. It is used for many council events yearly, and continues to be a focal point for scouting activity. The First Summer Camp was held in 1948. The last Summer Camp was held in 1980. Camp Mahonegon was put up for sale when the Allohak Council was dissolved.

Buckeye Council

Buckeye Council serves Scouts in Ohio and West Virginia.

Buckskin Council

Buckskin Council serves Scouts in Scouts in Kentucky, Ohio, Virginia and West Virginia.

Organization
The council is divided into several districts:
Chief Cornstalk District
Mountain Dominion District
Elk River District
Pioneer District
Seneca District
Cardinal District
MGM District
Muguyoh District

Mountaineer Area Council

The Mountaineer Area Council serves Scouts of Monongalia, Marion, Preston, Taylor, Barbour, Tucker, Randolph, Upshur, Harrison, Doddridge, Gilmer, and Lewis counties in North Central West Virginia. It is the only council in the state to exclusively serve counties of West Virginia.

History
The Mountaineer Area Council (#615) was founded 1928.

January 1, 2019 included the acquisition of eight counties to the council's territory, to include twelve counties total. The former Stonewall Jackson and Highland Districts of the Allohak Council joined the Mountaineer Area Council after the dissolution of the Allohak Council.

Organization
Heart of West Virginia District serving Harrison, Marion, Doddridge, Gilmer, Lewis, and Taylor Counties
Cheat District serving Monongalia, Preston, Tucker, Barbour, Upshur, and Randolph Counties

Camps
Camp Mountaineer is located in Morgantown, WV. It is the summer camp for the Mountaineer Area Council. Opening in 1956, Camp Mountaineer is a premiere year-round camping facility encompassing over 1,000 acres of West Virginia foliage and fauna. Hidden in the hills of Monongalia County, this serene camp has a variety of campsites and program areas near picturesque Strawn Lake. The Summer Camps include Scouts BSA Resident Camp, Cub Scout Resident Camp, Cub Scout Day Camp, and High Adventure Camp for Scouts 13 and up. From the youngest Scouts, there is the Mountain Man program, advanced leadership building skills of the C.O.P.E. and High Adventure Programs. The state of the art Shooting Sports facilities with specialized rifle, shotgun and archery ranges, and two climbing & rappelling towers.
Camp Lynn is located at 39°30'22.8"N 79°52'21.0"W. It is 168 acres of rustic camping just 2.6 miles from Camp Mountaineer on Boy Scout Rd. Camp Lynn is remote with limited access by vehicle. With many natural streams, a large field, and hard wood and pine forests surrounding it, it is the perfect location for backpacking, trail excursions or primitive camping.

Order of the Arrow
Menawngihella Lodge #550

Ohio River Valley Council

Ohio River Valley Council serves Scouts in West Virginia and Ohio.

History

Districts
Two Chiefs serves Harrison County, OH, Jefferson County, OH, Brooke County, WV Hancock County, WV
National Trail serves Belmont County, OH, Ohio County, WV
Mountaineer serves Monroe County, OH, Marshall County, WV, Wetzel County, WV, Tyler County, WV

Camps
Fort Steuben Scout Reservation - Freeport, Ohio
Sandscrest Scout Reservation - Wheeling, WV

Order of the Arrow

Onondaga Lodge 36

Laurel Highlands Council

Laurel Highlands Council served Scouts in Maryland, Pennsylvania, and West Virginia.

Shenandoah Area Council

Shenandoah Area Council serves Scouts in Virginia and West Virginia.

Stonewall Jackson Area Council

Stonewall Jackson Area Council serves Scouts in the Shenandoah Valley and Charlottesville areas of Virginia and Pendleton County, West Virginia.

Organization
The council is part of Area 7 of the Southern Region of the BSA. The council service center is in Waynesboro, Virginia and employs seven paid professional Scouters and an office staff. SJAC is divided into four districts:
 Massanutten District: Harrisonburg; Rockingham and Pendleton counties
 Monticello District: Charlottesville; Albemarle, Fluvanna, Greene, Louisa, Madison and Orange counties
 Southern District: Buena Vista, Covington, Clifton Forge, Lexington; Alleghany, Bath and Rockbridge counties
 Valley District: Staunton, Waynesboro; Augusta and Highland counties

Girl Scouting in West Virginia

There are two Girl Scout councils in West Virginia.

Girl Scout Council of the Nation's Capital

In October 2009 the old Shawnee Council of West Virginia joined with the Girl Scout Council of the Nation's Capital as part of the nationwide reorganization.

West Virginia Service Center: Martinsburg, West Virginia

Other Girl Scout Camps
The Girl Scouts Western Pennsylvania has Camp Roy Weller in Bruceton Mills, West Virginia.

Girl Scouts of Black Diamond Council

Girl Scouts of Black Diamond Council serves more than 20,000 girls in 61 counties in West Virginia, Ohio, Virginia, and Maryland.

Field Offices
Athens, Ohio  - Appalachian Field Office shared with Girl Scouts - Seal of Ohio
Steubenville, Ohio
Beckley, WV
Bluefield, WV
Chapmanville, WV
Huntington, WV
Fairmont, WV
Lewisburg, WV
Morgantown, WV
Parkersburg, WV
Walton, WV
Weston, WV
Wheeling, WV

Camps
Camp Giscowheco in Triadelphia, West Virginia
Camp Sandy Bend in Elizabeth, West Virginia
Camp Mamie Flynn in Logan, West Virginia
Camp Rocky Ledges in Milton, West Virginia

See also

Girl Scouts of Kentucky's Wilderness Road Council

References

Youth organizations based in West Virginia
West Virginia
Central Region (Boy Scouts of America)
Southern Region (Boy Scouts of America)